Zoe Golescu (1792–1879) was a Romanian revolutionary who participated in the Wallachian Revolution of 1848.

Life 
Zoe Farfara was born and married at the age of 13 Dinicu Golescu, the great boyar of the time, and became Zoe Golescu also known as Zinca or Zoița. They had together 5 children, 4 boys, Ștefan, Nicolae, Radu, Alexandru and a girl, Ana. Dinicu learned French, a language he would use in the letters he would send to his exiled sons in Western Europe.

He wrote texts in French and ancient Greek and attended the salons in Bucharest, where he learned about the revolutionary writings published in the West. Zoe Golescu was one of the educated and extremely pleasant women in Bucharest. After the marriage, she was a close friend of the Bucharest salons, on this channel she received revolutionary writings published in the West. Her letters to his four boys, all in French, beyond their extremely interesting content, are richly colored stylistically and strongly permeated by sentimentality, but by a strong and vigorous sentimentality. She accompanied her sons into exile after their participation in the Revolution of 1848. She returned to the country at the end of 1849 where she was forced by the authorities to self-exile to the Golești estate.

She fought for the social and intellectual emancipation of the Romanians.

She died at the age of 87, after losing four of her five children.

The Zinca Golescu National College in Pitești was named in her honor in 1971.

References

Bibliography
 George Marcu (coord.), Dicţionarul personalităţilor feminine din România, Editura Meronia, București, 2009

1792 births
1879 deaths
19th-century Romanian people
People of the Revolutions of 1848
Romanian revolutionaries
Zoe
19th-century Romanian women